"Sorry" is a song recorded by British alternative rock band Nothing but Thieves from their second studio album, Broken Machine (2017). The song was released by RCA Records on 19 July 2017, as the second single off the album. It reached number 89 on the UK Singles Chart.

Music video
A music video to accompany the release of "Sorry" was first released onto YouTube on 19 July 2017, through Nothing but Thieves' official YouTube account. Thomas James's second video for Nothing but Thieves.

Track listing

Charts

Certifications

Release history

References

2017 singles
2017 songs
RCA Records singles
Nothing but Thieves songs